Garry Pearson (born 7 September 1991) is a British rally driver from the town of Duns in the Scottish borders. He was Scottish Rally Champion in 2021.

Career
Pearson's first event was in 2008 driving a Peugeot 205 GTi where he finished 78th out of a field of 140.

Driving various cars over the years and with varying success he eventually managed a hugely successful year in 2021. That year he and regular co-driver Niall Burns netted four rally championship crowns. They won the Scottish Rally Championship, the Welsh Forest Rally Championship, the BTRDA Rally Series and the Motorsport UK National Rally Championship. Using a Škoda Fabia R5 they were the first crew in history to achieve the quadruple wins.

References

External links
 Garry Pearson - EWRC Profile page
 Garry Pearson Homepage - Official Website

Living people
Scottish Rally Championship
Scottish rally drivers
1991 births